Francis Wingrove (20 April 1863 – 27 May 1892) was an Australian cricketer. He played one first-class cricket match for Victoria in 1886.

See also
 List of Victoria first-class cricketers

References

External links
 

1863 births
1892 deaths
Australian cricketers
Victoria cricketers
Cricketers from Melbourne
People from Eltham, Victoria